Lower Town is the westernmost settlement on the island of St Martin's in the Isles of Scilly, England.

One of the island's two quays is located here, sometimes referred to as the Hotel Quay, as the only hotel on the island, Karma St Martin's, is located by it. Lower Town also has the island's only pub, The Seven Stones.

The settlement is largely built on the hillside of Tinkler's Hill. The quay is located by Teän Sound.

St Agnes
There is also a small settlement called Lower Town on the island of St Agnes. It contains the island's church (St Agnes' Church), community hall and sports facilities. In addition to Lower Town, St. Martin's has two other settlements called Higher Town and Middle Town.

References

Villages in the Isles of Scilly
St Martin's, Isles of Scilly